Essex Bridge may refer to:

 Essex Bridge, Staffordshire
 Essex Bridge (now Grattan Bridge), Dublin, Ireland